The Wound of Light is a 1997 Spanish film directed by José Luis Garci and starring Fernando Guillén, Mercedes Sampietro and Julia Gutiérrez Caba. The plot is based on a novel by Josep María de Sagarra. It was previously filmed in 1956 in a production directed by Tulio Demicheli

Plot
Dr. Mills, a renowned cardiologist, and his wife Isabel have had marital problems for a long time. They live accompanied by their two maids in a provincial capital, during the oppressive Spain of the 1950s. Unexpectedly, Dr. Mills falls in love with Julia, a younger colleague. Given the refusal of Isabel to a separation, the doctor resorts to crime, which is made easier by his profession.

Cast
Fernando Guillén - Doctor Molinos
 Mercedes Sampietro - Doña Isabel
 Julia Gutiérrez Caba - Sister Benedicta
María Massip - Escolástica
Beatriz Santana - Julia
Neus Asensi - Jovita
Cayetana Guillén Cuervo -Sister María

DVD release
La herida luminosa  is available in Region 2 DVD in Spanish with English.

External links
 

1997 films
Spanish drama films
1990s Spanish-language films
Films with screenplays by José Luis Garci
Films directed by José Luis Garci
1990s Spanish films